Florești-Stoenești is a commune located in Giurgiu County, Muntenia, Romania. It is composed of three villages: Florești, Palanca and Stoenești; the last is the administrative centre.

References

Communes in Giurgiu County
Localities in Muntenia